The women's singles event at the 2010 South American Games was held on 22–28 March.

Medalists

Draw

Finals

Top half

Bottom half

References 
 Draw

Women's Singles
South